L-2-hydroxyglutarate dehydrogenase, mitochondrial is an enzyme that in humans is encoded by the L2HGDH gene, also known as C14orf160,  on chromosome 14.

Function 

This gene encodes L-2-hydroxyglutarate dehydrogenase, a flavin adenine dinucleotide (FAD)-dependent enzyme that oxidizes L-2-hydroxyglutarate to alpha-ketoglutarate in a variety of mammalian tissues. Mutations in this gene cause L-2-hydroxyglutaric aciduria, a rare autosomal recessive neurometabolic disorder resulting in moderate to severe mental retardation.

L2HGDH codes for a protein that is 50 kDa in size. The L2HGDH protein contains a mitochondrial-targeting transit peptide and is localized to the mitochondrial inner membrane inside mitochondria inside the cell. The L2HGDH protein catalyzes the following reaction,  and  requires flavin adenine dinucleotide (FAD) as a co-factor:

(S)-2-hydroxyglutarate + acceptor = 2-oxoglutarate + reduced acceptor.

L-2-hydroxyglutarate is produced by promiscuous action of malate dehydrogenase on 2-oxoglutarate; the L2HGDH protein is thus an example of a metabolite repair enzyme because it reconverts the useless damage product L-2-hydroxyglutarate back to 2-oxoglutarate.

Clinical significance 

Mutations in the L2HGDH gene cause L-2-hydroxyglutaric aciduria, a rare autosomal recessive neurometabolic disorder. Individuals with L2HGDH mutations present toxic accumulation of high concentration of L-2-hydroxyglutaric acid in the plasma and cerebrospinal fluid. At least 70 disease-causing variants in the L2HGDH gene have been discovered in patients. Patients with L-2-hydroxyglutaric aciduria are associated with moderate to severe mental retardation, psychomotor retardation, cerebellar ataxia, macrocephaly, or epilepsy.

L2HGDH has a role in mediating differentiation in T-cells via its activity on S-2HG

Molecular interactions 

KLK10

See also 
 D2HGDH
 2-hydroxyglutarate synthase
 2-hydroxyglutarate dehydrogenase
 Hydroxyacid-oxoacid transhydrogenase

References

Further reading